Allen Helbig (born December 3, 1964) is a contemporary American illustrator and graphic designer. During his career as an art director for Warner Bros., he illustrated and art directed many children's books and video games based on the classic short animated cartoons starring Bugs Bunny, Daffy Duck, and other Looney Tunes characters.

He art directed Chuck Jones' book Daffy Duck for President. It was Jones' last published book before his death in 2002.

Sources
 Jones, Chuck (1997). Daffy Duck for President. Burbank, CA: Warner Bros. Worldwide Publishing. .
 The Art of Allen Helbig
 Allen Helbig at IMDB
 Moby Games

American illustrators
1964 births
Living people